Princess Manyabhadhorn (22 September 1854- 26 October 1885) was a Princess of Siam (later Thailand. She was a member of Siamese royal family is a daughter of King Mongkut and Chao Chom Manda Chan and half-sister of King Chulalongkorn.

Her mother was Chao Chom Manda Chan Suksathit (is a daughter of Suk Suksathit). She was a given full name by her father as Phra Chao Borom Wong Ther Phra Ong Chao Manyabhadhorn().

Princess Manyabhadhorn died 26 October 1885 at the age 30.

References 

1854 births
1885 deaths
19th-century Thai women
19th-century Chakri dynasty
Thai female Phra Ong Chao
Children of Mongkut
People from Bangkok
Daughters of kings